In linguistics and philosophy, modality refers to the ways language can express various relationships to reality or truth. For instance, a modal expression may convey that something is likely, desirable, or permissible. Quintessential modal expressions include modal auxiliaries such as "could", "should", or "must"; modal adverbs such as "possibly" or "necessarily"; and modal adjectives such as "conceivable" or "probable". However, modal components have been identified in the meanings of countless natural language expressions, including counterfactuals, propositional attitudes, evidentials, habituals, and generics.

Modality has been intensely studied from a variety of perspectives. Within linguistics, typological studies have traced crosslinguistic variation in the strategies used to mark modality, with a particular focus on its interaction with tense–aspect–mood marking. Theoretical linguists have sought to analyze both the propositional content and discourse effects of modal expressions using formal tools derived from modal logic. Within philosophy, linguistic modality is often seen as a window into broader metaphysical notions of necessity and possibility.

Force and flavor 
Modal expressions come in different categories called flavors. Flavors differ in how the possibilities they discuss relate to reality. For instance, an expression like "might" is said to have epistemic flavor, since it discusses possibilities compatible with some body of knowledge. An expression like "obligatory" is said to have deontic flavor, since it discusses possibilities which are required given the laws or norms obeyed in reality.

 (1) Agatha must be the murderer. (expressing epistemic modality)
 (2) Agatha must go to jail. (expressing deontic modality)

The sentence in (1) might be spoken by someone who has decided that all of the relevant facts in a particular murder investigation point to the conclusion that Agatha was the murderer, even though it may or may not actually be the case. The 'must' in this sentence thus expresses epistemic modality: "'for all we know', Agatha must be the murderer", where 'for all we know' is relative to some knowledge the speakers possess. In contrast, (2) might be spoken by someone who has decided that, according to some standard of conduct, Agatha has committed a vile crime, and therefore the correct course of action is to jail Agatha.

In classic formal approaches to linguistic modality, an utterance expressing modality is one that can always roughly be paraphrased to fit the following template:

 (3) According to [a set of rules, wishes, beliefs,...] it is [necessary, possible] that [the main proposition] is the case.

The set of propositions which forms the basis of evaluation is called the modal base. The result of the evaluation is called the modal force. For example, the utterance in (4) expresses that, according to what the speaker has observed, it is necessary to conclude that John has a rather high income:

 (4) John must be earning a lot of money.

The modal base here is the knowledge of the speaker, the modal force is necessity. By contrast, (5) could be paraphrased as ‘Given his abilities, the strength of his teeth, etc., it is possible for John to open a beer bottle with his teeth’. Here, the modal base is defined by a subset of John's abilities, the modal force is possibility.

 (5) John can open a beer bottle with his teeth.

Formal semantics 

Linguistic modality has been one of the central concerns in formal semantics and philosophical logic. Research in these fields has led to a variety of accounts of the propositional content and conventional discourse effects of modal expressions. The predominant approaches in these fields are based on modal logic. In these approaches, modal expressions such as must and can are analyzed as quantifiers over a set of possible worlds. In classical modal logic, this set is identified as the set of worlds accessible from the world of evaluation. Since the seminal work of Angelika Kratzer, formal semanticists have adopted a more finely grained notion of this set as determined by two conversational background functions called the modal base and ordering source respectively.

For an epistemic modal like English must or might, this set is understood to contain exactly those worlds compatible with the knowledge that the speaker has in the actual world. Assume for example that the speaker of sentence (4) above knows that John just bought a new luxury car and has rented a huge apartment. The speaker also knows that John is an honest person with a humble family background and doesn't play the lottery. The set of accessible worlds is then the set of worlds in which all these propositions which the speaker knows about John are true. The notions of necessity and possibility are then defined along the following lines: A proposition P follows necessarily from the set of accessible worlds, if all accessible worlds are part of P (that is, if p is true in all of these worlds). Applied to the example in (4) this would mean that in all the worlds which are defined by the speaker's knowledge about John, it is the case that John earns a lot of money (assuming there is no other explanation for John's wealth). In a similar way a proposition p is possible according to the set of accessible worlds (i.e. the modal base), if some of these worlds are part of P.

Recent work has departed from this picture in a variety of ways. In dynamic semantics, modals are analyzed as tests which check whether their prejacent is compatible with (or follows from) the information in the conversational common ground. Probabilistic approaches motivated by gradable modal expressions provide a semantics which appeals to speaker credence in the prejacent. Illocutionary approaches assume a sparser view of modals' propositional content and look to conventional discourse effects to explain some of the nuances of modals' use.

Grammatical expression of modality

Verbal morphology

In many languages modal categories are expressed by verbal morphology – that is, by alterations in the form of the verb. If these verbal markers of modality are obligatory in a language, they are called mood markers. Well-known examples of moods in some European languages are referred to as subjunctive, conditional, and indicative as illustrated below with examples from French, all three with the verb  ‘to have’. As in most Standard European languages, the shape of the verb conveys not only information about modality, but also about other categories such as person and number of the subject.

An example for a non-European language with a similar encoding of modality is Manam. Here, a verb is prefixed by a morpheme which encodes number and person of the subject. These prefixes come in two versions, realis and irrealis. Which one is chosen depends on whether the verb refers to an actual past or present event (realis), or merely to a possible or imagined event (irrealis).

Auxiliaries

Modal auxiliary verbs, such as the English words may, can, must, ought, will, shall, need, dare, might, could, would, and should, are often used to express modality, especially in the Germanic languages.

Ability, desirability, permission, obligation, and probability can all be exemplified by the usage of auxiliary modal verbs in English:

Ability: I can ride a bicycle (in the present); I could ride a bicycle (in the past)

Desirability: I should go; I ought to go

Permission: I may go

Obligation: I must go

Likelihood: He might be there; He may be there; He must be there

Lexical expression

Verbs such as "want," "need," or "belong" can be used to express modality lexically, as can adverbs.

 (9) It belongs in a museum!

Other

Complementizers (e.g. Russian) and conjunctions (e.g. Central Pomo) can be used to convey modality.

See also
 Angelika Kratzer
 Counterfactuals
 Dynamic semantics
 Evidentiality
 Frank R. Palmer
 Free choice inference
 Modal logic
 Modal subordination
 Modality (semiotics)
 Possible world
 Tense–aspect–mood
 English modal adverbs at Wiktionary

References

Further reading
 Asher, R. E. (ed.), The Encyclopedia of language and linguistics (pp. 2535–2540). Oxford: Pergamon Press.
 Blakemore, D. (1994). Evidence and modality. In R. E. Asher (Ed.), The Encyclopedia of language and linguistics (pp. 1183–1186). Oxford: Pergamon Press. .
 Bybee, Joan; Perkins, Revere, & Pagliuca, William (1994). The evolution of grammar: Tense, aspect, and modality in the languages of the world. Chicago: University of Chicago Press.
 Calbert, J. P. (1975). Toward the semantics of modality. In J. P. Calbert & H. Vater (Eds.), Aspekte der Modalität. Tübingen: Gunter Narr.
 Callaham, Scott N. (2010). Modality and the Biblical Hebrew Infinitive Absolute. Abhandlungen für die Kunde des Morgenlandes 71. Wiesbaden: Harrassowitz.
Chung, Sandra; & Timberlake, Alan (1985). Tense, aspect and mood. In T. Shopen (Ed.), Language typology and syntactic description: Grammatical categories and the lexicon (Vol. 3, pp. 202-258). Cambridge: Cambridge University Press.
 Kratzer, A. (1981). The notional category of modality. In H.-J. Eikmeyer & H. Rieser (Eds.), Words, worlds, and contexts: New approaches in word semantics. Berlin: Walter de Gruyter.
Palmer, F. R. (1979). Modality and the English modals. London: Longman.
 Palmer, F. R. (1994). Mood and modality. Cambridge Univ. Press. Second edition 2001.
 Saeed, John I. (2003). Sentence semantics 1: Situations: Modality and evidentiality. In J. I Saeed, Semantics (2nd. ed) (Sec. 5.3, pp. 135–143). Malden, MA: Blackwell Publishing. , .
 Sweetser, E. E. (1982). Root and epistemic modality: Causality in two worlds. Berkeley Linguistic Papers, 8, 484–507.

External links 

Modality and Evidentiality
What is mood and modality? SIL International, Glossary of linguistic terms.

Semantics
 
Philosophy of language
Formal semantics (natural language)